Dovey is a surname. Notable people with the surname include:

 Alice Dovey (1884–1969), American actress
 Bill Dovey (1894–1969), Australian judge
 Ceridwen Dovey (born 1980), South African-Australian anthropologist
 Ethel Dovey ((1882–1920), American stage actress and singer
 George Dovey (1862–1909), American baseball executive
 John Dovey (1865–?), American baseball executive
 Kim Dovey (21st century), Australian architectural critic